Barbour Island is an island in Mc Intosh County, in the U.S. state of Georgia.

Variant names are 'Barber's Island", "Barbers Island", and "Barbours Island". Barbour Island most likely derives its name from John Barber, an 18th-century pioneer settler.

References

Landforms of Chatham County, Georgia
Islands of Georgia (U.S. state)